Crutchfield is an unincorporated community in Fulton County, Kentucky, United States.

Possibly known previously as Alexander and Slap Out, a post office opened in 1874 with the name Crutchfield. The community was once a thriving commercial center on the Illinois Central Railroad.

References

Unincorporated communities in Fulton County, Kentucky
Unincorporated communities in Kentucky